Planetary Traveler is a soundtrack album by Paul Haslinger, for a film of the same name, released in 1998 through Third Planet Entertainment.

Track listing

Personnel 
Bill Ellsworth – cover art
Christopher Franke – arrangement
Paul Haslinger – instruments, production, engineering, mixing
Jan C. Nickman – production
Mitch Zelezny – mastering, engineering, mixing
Desmond Starr World Creator & Animator;– general art

References 

1998 soundtrack albums
Paul Haslinger albums